Leyre Eizaguirre (born 12 May 1980) is a Spanish diver. She competed in the women's 3 metre springboard event at the 2004 Summer Olympics.

References

1980 births
Living people
Spanish female divers
Olympic divers of Spain
Divers at the 2004 Summer Olympics
Place of birth missing (living people)